The Mortirolo Pass (el. 1852 m.) is a high mountain pass in the Alps in Italy. Also known as Passo della Foppa, it connects Mazzo di Valtellina (province of Sondrio) and Val Camonica (province of Brescia).  The road from Mazzo di Valtellina is one of the most demanding climbs in professional road bicycle racing, having been used in the Giro d'Italia stage race many times.

In May 2004, while training in Italian Alps, Lance Armstrong said that it was the hardest climb he had ever ridden.

Details of the climb
The mountain pass can be climbed from four different starting points, although the road departing from Mazzo di Valtellina is the most famous and only twice the Giro d'Italia climbed the mountain from alternative sides.

From Mazzo di Valtellina: the actual climb to the summit starts at Mazzo di Valtellina and is 12.4 kilometres long at an average of 10.5% (height gain: 1300 m), the maximum gradient being 18%.
From Grosio: the actual climb to the summit starts at Grosio and is 14.8 kilometres long at an average of 8.3% (height gain: 1222 m).
From Edolo: the actual climb to the summit starts at Edolo and is 17.2 kilometres long at an average of 6.7% (height gain: 1153 m).
From Tovo di Sant'Agata: the actual climb to the summit starts at Tovo and is 11.4 kilometres long at an average of 10.5% (height gain: 1194 m).

Giro d'Italia

The Mortirolo Pass featured several times in the Giro d'Italia, usually as the last or penultimate climb before the finish. The first time was in Stage 15 of the 1990 Giro d'Italia, between Morbegno and Aprica, starting from Edolo. Due to the steepness of the descent and the crashes that were occurring, the organisers decided to climb this mountain starting from Mazzo in subsequent years.

Since the death of Marco Pantani in 2004, stages of the Giro that go over the Mortirolo feature a special prize to the first man at the top of the pass, called Cima Pantani ("Pantani Top"). A monument to Marco Pantani was erected in 2006 by the Italian Professional Riders Association at the eighth kilometre of the road from Mazzo di Valtellina.

First rider passing Mortirolo in Giro d'Italia

See also
 List of highest paved roads in Europe
 List of mountain passes

References

External links
 Mortirolo pass details by climbbybike.com

Mountain passes of Italy
Climbs in cycle racing in Italy
Mountain passes of the Alps